Alain Junior Ollé Ollé (born 11 April 1987) is a Cameroonian former professional footballer who played as a midfielder.

Club career
Born in Douala, Ollé Ollé started his professional career in Uruguay with lowly Club Plaza Colonia de Deportes. In 2006, he signed with Club Nacional de Football in Montevideo.

In February 2008, Ollé Ollé joined German club SC Freiburg, but appeared very rarely for the Black Forest side, and never in the Bundesliga. In the 2010 January transfer window he was loaned to another team in the country, 2. Bundesliga's Rot Weiss Ahlen, appearing regularly but suffering relegation at the end of the 2009–10 season.

After a stint with Norway's Stabæk Fotball, Ollé Ollé spent the year 2012 in Sweden, representing Åtvidabergs FF in the Allsvenskan and Varbergs BoIS FC. He went back to Uruguay and Cerro.

He joined Norwegian club Melhus in March 2019.

References

External links

1987 births
Living people
Footballers from Douala
Cameroonian footballers
Association football midfielders
Uruguayan Primera División players
Plaza Colonia players
Club Nacional de Football players
C.A. Cerro players
2. Bundesliga players
SC Freiburg players
Rot Weiss Ahlen players
Eliteserien players
Stabæk Fotball players
Byåsen Toppfotball players
Allsvenskan players
Åtvidabergs FF players
Footballers at the 2008 Summer Olympics
Olympic footballers of Cameroon
Cameroonian expatriate footballers
Cameroonian expatriate sportspeople in Uruguay
Expatriate footballers in Uruguay
Cameroonian expatriate sportspeople in Germany
Expatriate footballers in Germany
Cameroonian expatriate sportspeople in Norway
Expatriate footballers in Norway
Cameroonian expatriate sportspeople in Sweden
Expatriate footballers in Sweden